Huntsworth is an international healthcare and communications group.

The Group's principal area of focus is health, which provides marketing and medical communications services to healthcare clients, which are primarily large and mid-size pharmaceutical and biotech companies. Huntsworth is owned by private investment firm Clayton, Dubilier & Rice.

Huntsworth's healthcare capability has three areas of expertise: 
 Medical – Lead Agency is Medistrava. Activities related to launch communications and post-launch real-world evidence. 
 Marketing – Lead Agency is Evoke. Marketing to patients, HCPs and payers for prescription drugs. 
 Immersive – Lead Agency is The Creative Engagement Group. All activities, both internal and external, of an experiential nature including Expo booth design/Medical congress & symposia organisation and execution.

Huntsworth also has a communications group, which provides a wide range of communications and advisory services including strategic communications, public affairs, investor relations and consumer marketing. Huntsworth’s communications pillar is split into three distinct agency sub-Groups: 
 General PR and Public Affairs – Lead Agency is Grayling. 
 Financial PR – Lead Agency is Citigate Dewe Rogerson. 
 Brands – Lead Agency is Red.

Clients
Graylings has lobbied for some of Britain's leading companies, like National Grid and BT, and has carried out PR work for Belarus. When working for Huntsworth, its founder Lord Chadlington personally lobbied for several clients, including the Stock Exchange, Associated British Foods and the Carlyle Group. Chadlington would also advise private equity companies on issues being examined by the Commons Treasury Select Committee as well as prime senior figures from private equity firms such as Permira, Kohlberg Kravis Roberts, 3i and the Carlyle Group before they appeared before the Treasury Select Committee.

Political connections
Huntsworth is a major donor to the UK Conservative Party: between them, Lord Chadlington and Huntsworth donated £77,000 to the Tories between 2005 and 2010, for instance.

References

External links 

Companies based in the City of London
Public relations companies of the United Kingdom
Health care companies of the United Kingdom
2020 mergers and acquisitions
Private equity portfolio companies